This is a list of notable events in music that took place in 1551.

Events 
Pope Julius III brings his protégé Palestrina to Rome as maestro di cappella of the Cappella Giulia at St. Peter's Basilica.
Famous confrontation between Nicola Vicentino and Vicente Lusitano about Greek diatonic, chromatic and enharmonic genera.
Giralamo Parabosco elected first organist at St Mark's, Venice
The music printing and publishing company Le Roy & Ballard was founded in Paris by cousins Adrian Le Roy and Robert Ballard
August 14 – Le Roy & Ballard obtain royal privilege to print music from Henry II
Francisco Guerrero appointed voce-maestro de capilla at Seville Cathedral
Cristobal Morales appointed maestro di capilla at Malaga Cathedral
Loys Bourgeois imprisoned in Geneva for changing psalm tunes without a license. He was released following John Calvin's personal intervention

Publications 
Giovanni Animuccia – Second book of madrigals for five voices (Rome: Antonio Blado)
Constanzo Festa – First book of madrigals for three voices, published posthumously
Claude Goudimel – First book of psalms for three, four, and five voices (Paris: Nicolas du Chemin)
Adrian Le Roy – Book of lute arrangements  (Paris: Le Roy and Ballard)
Tielman Susato – Collection of dance music  was published in Antwerp

Sacred music 
Johann Walter – Gelobet seist du, Jesu Christ

Births 
October 8 – Giulio Caccini, Italian composer (died 1618)
probable – Benedetto Pallavicino, Italian organist and composer (died 1601)
approx. year – Paolo Virchi, Italian composer, viol player and organist (died 1610)
approx. year – Sebastian de Vivanco, Spanish composer, priest and teacher (died 1622)

Deaths 
date unknown – Albert de Rippe, Italian lutenist and composer (born c.1500)
 Johannes Wannenmacher, German composer
 August 12 – Paul Speratus, theologian and hymn writer
 November – Juan Alvarez de Almorox, died in Segovia
approx. year – Jean L'Heritier, composer and singer, died probably in northern Italy

 
Music
16th century in music
Music by year